Ted Thomas may refer to:
Ted Thomas (judge) (born 1934), New Zealand jurist
Ted Thomas Sr. (1935-2020), American cleric
Ted Thomas (footballer, born 1898) (1898–1965), Australian rules football player at the Melbourne Football Club
Ted Thomas (footballer, born 1922) (1922–1996), Australian rules football player at the North Melbourne Football Club
Ted Thomas (priest) (born 1927), British Church of England priest
Ted Thomas (rower) (1894–1943), Australian rower
Teddy Thomas (rugby union) (born 1993), French rugby union player
Edwin "Guboo" Ted Thomas (1909-2002), Aboriginal elder

See also
Theodore Thomas (disambiguation)
Edward Thomas (disambiguation)
Edmund Thomas (disambiguation)